Cathedral College may refer to various schools:

 Cathedral College Wangaratta, Australia
 Cathedral College of the Immaculate Conception, Queens, New York, United States
 Catholic Cathedral College, Christchurch, New Zealand
 St Mary's Cathedral College, Sydney, Australia
 The Cathedral College, Rockhampton, Australia
 Cathedral College, East Melbourne, Australia